Maxdo Centre is a skyscraper in Changning District, Shanghai, China. It is 241 metres high, and has 55 floors.

See also
 List of tallest buildings in Shanghai

External links
 
 

2002 establishments in China
Buildings and structures completed in 2002
Skyscraper office buildings in Shanghai